The Pix/Capri Theatre is a historic movie theater in Jackson, Mississippi.  It is currently undergoing renovation and is anticipated to reopen in 2022.

Built in 1939 as the Pix Theatre, on the historic US Highway 51, known as North State Street in Jackson.  While many Jackson movie theaters were going strong through the 1950s, the Pix ceased operations by 1957.  In 1965, the building was sold to Cinema Guild Inc and reopened as The Capri Theatre. The Capri was initially successful; however, with the development of multiplex theaters in the metro Jackson market, the Capri changed formats and began relying on second run/bargain films by the late 1970s. By the early 1980s, the Capri had begun to show X rated  films in order to remain open. In 1985, the Capri closed.   The Pix/Capri was designed by a Jackson architect, Jack Canizaro, who was also an investor in the project.  The Mississippi Department of Archives and History designated the building as a Mississippi Landmark.

By 2005, after twenty years of sitting vacant, the Capri reopened as a venue for live music, independent films and live theater performances.  Various groups made efforts to raise money for its restoration without success. In 2012 plans were announced to develop the building into a mixed-use venue including a multiscreen dinner theater.

References

Buildings and structures in Jackson, Mississippi